The Lynx du cégep Édouard-Montpetit women's ice hockey team, previously Lynx du Collège Édouard-Montpetit,  represents Cégep Édouard-Montpetit in the Hockey collégial féminin RSEQ of the Réseau du sport étudiant du Québec (RSEQ). The team is based in Longueuil, in the southern Greater Montreal metropolitan area in Quebec and their home venue is the Aréna Émile-Butch-Bouchard.

Team history
On April 2004, the Ligue de hockey féminin collégial AA announced that two new women's hockey teams would debut for the 2005–06 season. The Lynx were founded in the autumn of 2004. In 2009, the Lynx gained their first prominent attention when they eliminated the Dawson Blues in a 2009 playoff as they claimed their first championship. A second consecutive championship confirmed their superiority in Quebec women's collegiate ice hockey.

Season by season results
Note: GP = Games played, W = Wins, L = Losses, T = Ties, OTL = Overtime losses, GF = Goals for, GA = Goals against, Pts = Points.

Season standings

Playoffs results
Following the regular season, a playoff was held to determine the Collegial women's champion in Quebec.

Playoff 2011-12
First round
Semi-finals and Championship Final game 2011-12

Playoff 2010-11
First round
The Lynx finished in first place in Group A.

Note:  
GP = Games played,  W = Wins, L = Losses, OTL = Overtime losses, GF = Goals for, GA = Goals against,  Pts = Points.

Semi-finals and Championship Final game 2010-11

Playoff 2009-10
First round
The Lynx finished in first place in their respective group.

Note:  
GP = Games played,  W = Wins, L = Losses, OTL = Overtime losses, GF = Goals for, GA = Goals against,  Pts = Points.

Semi-finals and Championship Final game 2009-10
winner: Lynx du Collège Édouard-Montpetit

Playoffs 2008-09
Semi-finals and Championship Final game

winner:Lynx du Collège Édouard-Montpetit

Current roster 2011-12

Coaching staff

    General Manager: Patrick Larivière
    Head Coach:   Patrick Larivière 
    Assistant Coach:   Éric Miculescu
    Assistant Coach: Marie-Laurence Cyr 
    Assistant Coach: Caroline Ouellette
    Physioherapist:  Marie-Josée Lefebvre & Marie-Claude Lapointe

Team awards and honors
2009-10 Ligue de hockey féminin collégial AA Championship
2010 won the Challenge féminin Panthères AAA U-17 ans 
2009 McGill Tournament invitation champions
2009 won the Tournoi universitaire de Moncton
2008-09  Ligue de hockey féminin collégial AA Championship
2008-09 Champion of Tournoi Cergy (in France)

Individual awards and honors
2010-11 season
 Player of the Year Award: Mélodie Daoust
 5 Lynx were named to the All-Star teams of the league: Mélodie Daoust (forward), Ariane Barker (forward),  Maude Gélinas (forward), Valérie Watson (defensemen), Cynthia Whissell (defensemen).
 Season 2009-10
 Rookie of the Year Award: Mélodie Daoust
5 Lynx were named to the All-Star team of the League:  Mélodie Daoust (forward), Katia Heydra-Clément (forward), Sophie Brault (defensemen), Janique Duval (defensemen), Roxanne Douville (goaltender),
 Season 2008-09
Fair-play Award: Katia Clément-Heydra
 3 lynx on the star team of the League: Katia Clément-Heydra (forward), Casandra Dupuis (forward), Roxanne Douville (goaltender),

Awards and individual honors are not available for the other seasons.

Players in CIS or NCAA

International

See also
 Hockey collégial féminin RSEQ
 Coupe Dodge

References

External links
  
  
 Collège Édouard-Montpetit Website 

Women's ice hockey teams in Canada
Ice hockey teams in Quebec
Amateur ice hockey
Youth ice hockey
Sport in Longueuil
Women in Quebec